Zenaga may refer to:
the Zenaga people
the Zenaga language